The final of the Men's hammer throw event at the 1986 European Championships in Stuttgart, West Germany was held on August 30, 1986. The qualification round was staged a day earlier, on August 29, 1986.

Medalists

Abbreviations
All results shown are in metres

Records

Qualification
Qualification Distance = 76.00 metres (or top 12 to final)

Overall Ranking

Final

Participation
According to an unofficial count, 21 athletes from 11 countries participated in the event.

 (2)
 (2)
 (3)
 (2)
 (1)
 (1)
 (3)
 (1)
 (2)
 (1)
 (3)

See also
 1983 Men's World Championships Hammer Throw (Helsinki)
 1984 Men's Olympic Hammer Throw (Los Angeles)
 1986 Hammer Throw Year Ranking
 1987 Men's World Championships Hammer Throw (Rome)
 1988 Men's Olympic Hammer Throw (Seoul)

References

 Results

Hammer throw
Hammer throw at the European Athletics Championships